Maarten Froger (born May 17, 1977) is a former field hockey striker from the Netherlands, who won the 2002 Champions Trophy with the Dutch Men's Team in Cologne, Germany. He played a total number of 21 international matches for Holland, in which he scored four goals.

External links
 Dutch Hockey Federation (through the WaybackMachine)

1977 births
Living people
Dutch male field hockey players
Sportspeople from Breda
21st-century Dutch people